Gabbs Airport  is a county-owned public-use airport located four nautical miles (7 km) northwest of the central business district of Gabbs, a city in Nye County, Nevada, United States.

Facilities and aircraft 
It has two runways with dirt surfaces: 8/26 measuring 5,900 by 65 feet (1,798 x 20 m) and 16/34 measuring 2,800 by 65 feet (853 x 20 m). For the 12-month period ending April 30, 2007, the airport had 200 aircraft operations, all of which were general aviation.

References

External links 
  from Nevada DOT
 

Airports in Nevada
Buildings and structures in Nye County, Nevada
Transportation in Nye County, Nevada